Florianópolis Gay Carnival (often just referred to as Floripa Gay Carnival) is an LGBT carnival located in Florianópolis, Brazil. The carnival includes the Pop Gay competition, a beauty contest for drag queens and transgender people. The Pop Gay Festival during Carnival and our pride parade, both with around 40,000 to 50,000 people.

The Bar of Deca, is the most famous gay beach bar in the city, has DJs from 1 PM until well after the sunset in Summer, in Mole Beach, most frequented by LGBT people.

See also

 List of LGBT events
 LGBT rights in Brazil
 LGBT rights in the World

References

LGBT events in Brazil
Brazilian Carnival
Electronic music festivals in Brazil